Hausbrunn is a town in the district of Mistelbach in the Austrian state of Lower Austria.

Population

Personalities
Pediatrician Hans Asperger, the doctor after whom Asperger's Syndrome is named after, was born here.

Gottfried von Preyer, regens chori of St. Stephen's Cathedral, Vienna, Rector of the Vienna Conservatory, and teacher of Joseph Joachim.

References

External links 

Cities and towns in Mistelbach District